Pedroso (meaning "stony" in Spanish and Portuguese) may refer to:

People
Carlos Pedroso, Cuban fencer
 César Pedroso, Cuban pianist
Eustaquio Pedroso, Cuban baseball player
Iván Pedroso, Cuban athlete, Olympic and multiple World Champion in long jump
 Nélson Pedroso, Portuguese footballer
 Paulo Pedroso, Portuguese politician
Regino Pedroso, Cuban poet
 Ricardo Pedroso, Portuguese swimmer
 Yadier Pedroso, Cuban baseball player
 Yadisleidy Pedroso, Italian athlete of Cuban origin

Places
El Pedroso, a municipality in Seville, Spain
Pedroso, La Rioja, a municipality in La Rioja, Spain
Pedroso, Portugal, a parish in the municipality of Vila Nova de Gaia, Portugal
Pedroso, Cantabria, a place in the municipality of Villacarriedo, Cantabria, Spain
Pedroso, Rego, a place in the parish of Rego, Celorico de Basto, Portugal
Pedroso de Acim, a municipality in Cáceres, Spain
Villar del Pedroso, a municipality in Cáceres, Spain
Monte Pedroso, a mountain close to Santiago de Compostela, Spain

Others
Battle of Pedroso, fought between Galicia and Portugal in 1071
Pedroso's disease (Chromoblastomycosis), a fungal skin infection